Wellington Township may refer to the following places:

 Wellington Township, Sumner County, Kansas
 Wellington Township, Maine, former name of Monticello, Maine
 Wellington Township, Alpena County, Michigan
 Wellington Township, Renville County, Minnesota
 Wellington Township, Bottineau County, North Dakota
 Wellington Township, Lorain County, Ohio
 Wellington Township, Minnehaha County, South Dakota

See also

Wellington (disambiguation)

Township name disambiguation pages